Sheila Jackson may refer to:

Sheila Jackson Lee (born 1950), née Sheila Jackson, American politician from Texas
Sheila Jackson (Shameless), a character from the British TV series Shameless
Shelia Gallagher (formally Jackson), character from the American remake 
Sheila Jackson (chess player), English chess player